Gabunamine is a bisindole isolate of Tabernaemontana with anticancer activity.

Notes
Plant anticancer agents V: new bisindole alkaloids from Tabernaemontana johnstonii stem bark

Alkaloids found in Apocynaceae